Globe Trekker (sometimes called Pilot Guides in Australia and Thailand,  and originally broadcast as Lonely Planet) was a British adventure tourism television series produced by Pilot Productions. The British series was inspired by the Lonely Planet travelbooks and began airing in 1994.  Globe Trekker is broadcast in over 40 countries across six continents. The programme won over 20 international awards, including six American Cable Ace awards.

Program synopsis 
Each episode features a host, called a traveller, who travels with a camera crew to a country/major city and experiences the sights, sounds, and culture that the location has to offer. Special episodes feature in-depth city, beach, ape, nature, road trip, pilgrimage, slave trade, historic site, pirate, animal, dive, volcano, war, shopping, journey, history, festival, and food guides.

The show often goes far beyond popular tourist destinations in order to give viewers a more authentic look at local culture. Presenters usually participate in different aspects of regional life, such as attending a traditional wedding or visiting a mining community. They address the viewer directly, acting as tourists-turned-tour guides, but are also filmed interacting with locals and discovering interesting locations in (mostly) unrehearsed sequences. Globe Trekker also sometimes includes brief interviews with backpackers who share tips on independent travel in that particular country or city.

Production details
It usually takes 12 to 15 weeks to complete an episode of the show from start to finish, including at least four weeks of research, three weeks of planning and preparation (speaking to tourist boards, making travel arrangements), two to three weeks of actual filming, and three weeks of editing and post-production.

The traveller is often accompanied by five or six members of camera and production crew, who almost never appear on camera. Specifically, the crew consists of a camera operator and a sound technician, plus a producer and a director, who scout locations two weeks before filming. A driver, pilot, or other type of facilitator is often hired locally. A traveller and crew almost never spend more than three nights in one particular area.

Theme music
The series is known for its distinctive theme and background music, which consists largely of instrumental, downtempo, electronic dance compositions containing global folk music elements. Most of the music is written for the show by Ian Ritchie, Michael Conn, Colin Winston-Fletcher, with additional music from Makoto Sakamoto, Nainita Desai & Malcolm Laws, Nomad, Jesper Mattsson, The Insects, The West India Company, Stephen Luscombe, and Pandit Dinesh. Several collection of tracks from the show have been released as albums, including Globe Trekker: Ambient Journeys, Globe Trekker: Earth Journeys (volumes 1 and 2), Globe Trekker: Music From The TV Series (volumes 1 and 2), Globe Trekker: Asian Journeys, Globe Trekker: Latin American Journeys, and Globe Trekker: World Jam.

Presenters
Pilot Productions employs several presenters for its variety of programs which include Planet Food, Bazaar, World Cafe, and Treks in a Wild World. This list of presenters is limited to those appearing in Globe Trekker.

 Jonathan Atherton
 Danielle Baker
 Brianna Barnes
 Estelle Bingham
 Christina Chang
 Bobby Chinn
 KT Comer
 Bradley Cooper, who hosted a number of episodes in the early 2000s before achieving success as a Hollywood actor
 Mark Crowdy
 Zoe D’Amato
 Andrew Daddo
 Tyler Florence
 Neil Gibson
 Nikki Grosse
 Zay Harding
 Katy Haswell
 Judith Jones
 Padma Lakshmi, who would go on to host major productions such as Top Chef
 Megan McCormick
 Shilpa Mehta
 Holly Morris
 Eils Nevitt
 Zoe Palmer
 Merrilees Parker
 Alex Riley
 Sami Sabiti
 Justine Shapiro
 Lavinia Tan
 Adela Úcar
 Lucille Whitney
 Ian Wright
 Matt Young
 Judith Jones

Reception 
In 2020 The Washington Post listed the show, as hosted on the Vudu video streaming service, as one of the best adventure travel television shows.

Episodes

Season 1 (1994)

Season 2 (1995)

Season 3 (1996)

Season 4 (1997)

Season 5 (1998)

Season 6 (1999)

Season 7 (2000)

Season 8 (2001)

Season 9 (2002)

Season 10 (2003)

Season 11 (2004)

Season 12 (2005)

Season 13 (2006)

Season 14 (2007)

Season 15 (2008)

Season 16 (2009)

Round The World

Season 17 (2010)

References

External links
Official website 

Adventure reality television series
British travel television series
American travel television series
American adventure television series
1994 American television series debuts
2016 American television series endings
2000s American television series
1994 British television series debuts
2016 British television series endings
1990s British travel television series
2000s British travel television series
2010s British travel television series
British adventure television series
English-language television shows
Channel 4 original programming
Adventure travel
PBS original programming